The Serbian Hockey League Season for 2006-2007 consisted of 16 games. It lasted from October 20 to January 6. In the end HK Partizan won. It was the first time that HK Beostar participated.

Final standings

Playoffs
There were two rounds in the playoffs- semifinals and finals.

Semifinals
KHK Crvena Zvezda vs HK Partizan
Game 1 Crvena Zvezda wins 4:3 (2:1, 2:1, 0:1)
Game 2 Partizan wins 3:1 (0:0, 3:0, 0-1)
Game 3 Partizan wins 6:0 (1:0, 1:0, 4:0)
Partizan wins series 3-1
HK Vojvodina vs HK Novi Sad
Game 1 Vojvodina wins 4-1 (0:0,1:0,3:1)
Game 2 Vojvodina wins 3:1 (0:0, 3:0, 0-1)
Vojvodina wins series 2-0

Finals
HK Partizan vs HK Vojvodina
Game 1 Partizan wins 5:2 (2:0; 0:2; 3:0)
Game 2 Partizan wins 5:2 (3:0, 1:0, 1:2)
Game 3 Partizan wins 6:0

Third Place
Crvena Zvezda vs Novi Sad
Game 1: Crvena Zvzeda wins 5:4 in overtime
Game 2: Novi Sad wins 4:2
Game 3: Novi Sad wins 3:1
Novi Sad wins series 2-1

Schedule and results
 20.10.2006 Vojvodina - Novi Sad 5 : 1
 20.10.2006 Partizan - Beostar 6 : 0
 24.10.2006 Crvena zvezda - Partizan 0 : 8
 24.10.2006 Beostar - Vojvodina 3 : 4
 27.10.2006 Beostar - Novi Sad 1 : 5
 27.10.2006 Vojvodina - Crvena zvezda 7 : 2
 31.10.2006 Novi Sad - Partizan 5 : 3
 31.10.2006 Crvena zvezda - Beostar 9 : 4
 03.11.2006 Vojvodina - Partizan 2 : 3
 03.11.2006 Crvena zvezda - Novi Sad 1 : 5
 07.11.2006 Beostar - Partizan 1 : 9
 10.11.2006 Partizan - Crvena zvezda 3 : 0
 10.11.2006 Vojvodina - Beostar 10 : 3
 17.11.2006 Novi Sad - Beostar 5 : 2
 17.11.2006 Crvena zvezda - Vojvodina 3 : 4
 18.11.2006 Beostar - Partizan 0 : 9
 21.11.2006 Partizan - Novi Sad 2 : 2
 21.11.2006 Beostar - Crvena zvezda 5 : 7
 24.11.2006 Partizan - Vojvodina 7 : 0
 24.11.2006 Novi Sad - Crvena zvezda 2 : 4
 28.11.2006 Novi Sad - Vojvodina 1 : 0
 05.01.2007 Beostar - Novi Sad 6 : 5
 05.01.2007 Vojvodina - Crvena zvezda 2 : 0
 09.01.2007 Novi Sad - Partizan 4 : 2
 12.01.2007 Vojvodina - Partizan 3 : 6
 12.01.2007 Crvena zvezda - Novi Sad 4 : 4
 16.01.2007 Partizan - Beostar 6 : 3
 17.01.2007 Novi Sad - Vojvodina 0 : 8
 19.01.2007 Partizan - Crvena zvezda 4 : 2
 19.01.2007 Vojvodina - Beostar 11 : 4
 23.01.2007 Crvena zvezda - Partizan 4 : 6
 23.01.2007 Beostar - Vojvodina 1 : 7
 26.01.2007 Novi Sad - Beostar 7 : 4
 26.01.2007 Crvena zvezda - Vojvodina 0 : 2
 30.01.2007 Partizan - Novi Sad 2 : 2
 30.01.2007 Beostar - Crvena zvezda 4 : 7
 02.02.2007 Partizan - Vojvodina 2 : 3
 02.02.2007 Novi Sad - Crvena zvezda 2 : 2
 06.02.2007 Vojvodina - Novi Sad 8 : 2
 06.02.2007 Crvena zvezda - Beostar 8 : 5

Serbian Hockey League
Serbian Hockey League seasons
Serb